The Darkhad, Darqads, Dalhut, or Darhut (Mongolian for "Untouchables", "Protected Ones", or "Workmen of Darkhan"; Chinese: 达尔扈特, pinyin: Dá'ěrhùtè) are a subgroup of  Mongol people living mainly in northern Mongolia, in the Bayanzürkh, Ulaan-Uul, Renchinlkhümbe, Tsagaannuur sums of Khövsgöl Province; as well as Inner Mongolia in northern China. The Darkhad valley is named after them. The regional variant of Mongol language is the Darkhad dialect.  In the 2000 census, 16,268 people identified themselves as Darkhad.

The Darkhad were originally part of the Oirat or Khotgoid tribes. Between 1549 and 1686, they were subjects of Zasagt Khan aimag and the Khotgoid Altan Khan. In 1786 they became part of the Jebtsundamba Khutuktu's shabi otog. At roughly the same time they became known as Black Darkhad.

In 1947, 2071 people from 462 households were eligible to be Darkhad. They were liable for maintaining the Great Khan's mausoleum at their own expense prior to the erection of a permanent government-owned structure in 1954–6. The Darkhad believe they are the direct descendants of the soul guards of Genghis Khan.

Many Darkhad practise shamanism.

See also
 Darkhad language
 Mausoleum of Genghis Khan
 Taiga (1992 film)

References

Citations

Bibliography
 .

External links
BBC: Darhad Tribe
"Guarding the Spirit of Our Ancestor, Genghis Khan."  

Mongol peoples
Ethnic groups in Mongolia
Khövsgöl Province
Inner Mongolia